Transvaginal refers to a transluminal procedure through the reproductive tract of the vagina, including:

Transvaginal oocyte retrieval
Transvaginal ultrasonography
Transvaginal mesh